Phumelele Stone Sizani (born 2 March 1954) is a South African politician who was, until his resignation on 2 March 2016, a Member of the National Assembly of South Africa and the African National Congress Chief Whip. It has been reported that upon leaving Parliament his next post will be South African Ambassador to Germany.

Early life
At the age of 18 he was arrested and sent to Robben Island as a political prisoner, where he remained incarcerated from 1978–1980. He graduated with an MA in Development Studies from the University of East Anglia in 1995, where he was a Chevening Scholar.

References

1954 births
Living people
Alumni of the University of East Anglia
Members of the National Assembly of South Africa
African National Congress politicians
Inmates of Robben Island
Chevening Scholars